Themistocles M. Rassias (born April 2, 1951) is a Greek mathematician, and a professor at the National Technical University of Athens (Εθνικό Μετσόβιο Πολυτεχνείο), Greece. He has published more than 300 papers, 10 research books and 45 edited volumes in research Mathematics as well as 4 textbooks in Mathematics (in Greek) for university students. His research work has received more than 18,000 citations according to Google Scholar and more than 5,500 citations according to MathSciNet. His h-index is 48. He serves as a member of the
Editorial Board of several international mathematical journals.

Education

He received his Ph.D. in Mathematics from the University of California at Berkeley in June 1976. Professor Stephen Smale and Professor Shiing-Shen Chern have been his thesis and academic advisors, respectively.

Research

His work extends over several fields of Mathematical Analysis. It includes Nonlinear Functional Analysis, Functional Equations, Approximation Theory, Analysis on Manifolds, Calculus of Variations, Inequalities, Metric Geometry and their Applications.

He has contributed a number of results in the stability of minimal submanifolds, in the solution of Ulam's Problem for approximate homomorphisms in Banach spaces, in the theory of isometric mappings in metric spaces and in Complex analysis (Poincaré's inequality and harmonic mappings).

Terminology 

(i) Hyers–Ulam–Rassias stability of functional equations.

(ii) The Aleksandrov–Rassias problem  for isometric mappings.

Awards and honors

He has received a number of honors and awards including:

 1977–1978 and 1978–1979, Membership offer from the School of Mathematics of the Institute for Advanced Study in Princeton, that he could not accept for family reasons.
 1980, Research Associate at the Department of Mathematics of Harvard University, invited by Raoul Bott.
 1980, Visiting Research Professor at the Department of Mathematics of the Massachusetts Institute of Technology, invited by F. P. Peterson.
 1985–1986, 1986–1987, Teacher of the Year.
 1987, Accademico Ordinario of the Accademia Tiberina, Roma.
 1989–1990, 1990–1991, 1991–1992, Outstanding Faculty Member, University of La Verne, California (Athens Campus).
 1991, Fellow of the Royal Astronomical Society of London.
 2003, A volume entitled Stability of Functional Equations of Ulam-Hyers-Rassias Type was dedicated to the 25 years since the publication of Th. M. Rassias' Theorem, edited by S. Czerwik, Hadronic Press Inc., Florida.
 2007, A special volume of the Banach Journal of Math. Analysis (Vol. 1, Issues 1 & 2) was dedicated to the 30th Anniversary of Th. M. Rassias' Stability Theorem.
 2008, Doctor Honoris Causa (DHC), University of Alba Iulia (Romania).
 2009, Α special issue of the Journal Nonlinear Functional Analysis and Applications (Vol.14, No.5) was dedicated to the 30th Anniversary of Th. M. Rassias' Stability Theorem.
 2010, Ulam Prize in Mathematics.
 2010, Honorary Doctorate, University of Nis (Serbia).
 2011,  Α special issue of the Journal of Nonlinear Sciences and Applications (Vol.4, No.2) was dedicated to the 60th Anniversary of Th. M. Rassias' birth.
 2012, A volume entitled Nonlinear Analysis. Stability, Approximation, and Inequalities. In honor of Themistocles M. Rassias on the occasion of his 60th birthday. Eds., P. M. Pardalos; P. G. Georgiev and H. M. Srivastava was published by Springer, New York, 2012, XXIX+893 pp.
 2016, Doctor Honoris Causa (DHC), Valahia University of Targoviste (Romania) (see also).
 2016, Award for Lifetime Achievements in Mathematics, Conference on Ulam's Type Stability, Cluj-Napoca, Romania.

Works
 Th. M. Rassias, On the stability of the linear mapping in Banach spaces, Proceedings of the American Mathematical Society 72(1978), 297-300. [Translated in Chinese and published in: Mathematical Advance in Translation, Chinese Academy of Sciences 4 (2009), 382-384.]
 Th. M. Rassias, New characterizations of inner product spaces, Bulletin des Sciences Mathematiques, 108 (1984), 95-99.
 Th. M. Rassias, On the stability of functional equations and a problem of Ulam, Acta Applicandae Mathematicae 62(1) (2000), 23-130.
 Th. M. Rassias, Major trends in Mathematics, Newsletter European Math. Soc. 62 (2006), 13-14. Translated in Chinese and published in:Mathematical Advance in Translation, Chinese Academy of Sciences 2 (2008), 172-174.
 Th. M. Rassias and J. Brzdek, Functional Equations in Mathematical Analysis, Springer, New York, 2012.
 Th. M. Rassias and J. Simsa, Finite Sums Decompositions in Mathematical Analysis, John Wiley & Sons Ltd. (Wiley-Interscience Series in Pure and Applied Mathematics), Chichester, New York, Brisbane, Toronto, Singapore, 1995.

Notes

References
 P. M. Pardalos, P. G. Georgiev and H. M. Srivastava (eds.), Nonlinear Analysis. Stability, Approximation, and Inequalities. In honor of Themistocles M. Rassias on the occasion of his 60th birthday, Springer, New York, 2012.
 J.-R. Lee and D.-Y. Shin, On the Cauchy-Rassias stability of a generalized additive functional equation, J. Math. Anal. Appl. 339(1)(2008), 372–383.
 A. Najati, Cauchy-Rassias stability of homomorphisms associated to a Pexiderized Cauchy-Jensen type functional equation, J. Math. Inequal.  3(2)(2009), 257-265.
 C.-G. Park, Homomorphisms between Lie JC*- algebras and Cauchy – Rassias stability of Lie JC*-algebra derivations, J. Lie Theory, 15(2005), 393–414.
 M. Craioveanu, M. Puta and Th.M. Rassias, Old and New Aspects in Spectral Geometry, Kluwer Academic Publishers, Dordrecht, Boston, London, 2001.
 P. Enflo and M.S. Moslehian,  An interview with Themistocles M. Rassias, Banach J. Math. Anal., 1 (2007), no. 2, 252-260. (Also translated in Chinese )
 V. A. Faizev, Th. M. Rassias and P. K. Sahoo, The space of -additive mappings on semigroups, Transactions of the American Mathematical Society 354(11) (2002), 4455-4472.
 W. Gautschi, G. Mastroianni and Th. M. Rassias, Approximation and Computation: In Honor of Gradimir V. Milovanović, Springer, New York, 2011.
 D. H. Hyers, G. Isac and Th. M. Rassias, Stability of Functional Equations in Several Variables, Birkhäuser Verlag, Boston, Basel, Berlin, 1998.
 D. H. Hyers, G. Isac and Th. M. Rassias, Topics in Nonlinear Analysis and Applications, World Scientific Publishing Co., Singapore, New Jersey, London, 1997.
 S.-M. Jung, Hyers-Ulam-Rassias Stability of Functional Equations in Mathematical Analysis, Hadronic Press Inc., Florida, 2001.
 G. V. Milovanović, D. S. Mitrinović and Th. M. Rassias, Topics in Polynomials: Extremal Problems, Inequalities, Zeros, World Scientific Publishing Co., Singapore, New Jersey, London, 1994.
 P. M. Pardalos, Th. M. Rassias and A. A. Khan, Nonlinear Analysis and Variational Problems, Springer Optimization and its Applications 35, Springer, Berlin, 2010.

Further reading
Hyers-Ulam-Rassias stability, in: Encyclopaedia of Mathematics, Supplement III Hazewinkel, M. (ed.), Kluwer (2001) , pp. 194–196.
Ulam-Hyers-Rassias Stability of Functional Equations, in: S. Czerwik, Functional Equations and Inequalities in Several Variables (Part II, pp. 129–260).

External links 
 Themistocles M. Rassias' Curriculum Vitae.  
 
 Listed in Highly Cited Greek Scientists

1951 births
Living people
20th-century Greek mathematicians
21st-century Greek mathematicians